Alex Marvez (born April 3, 1971) is an American sportscaster, journalist and author who currently works for Sirius XM NFL Radio, where he hosts a daily prime-time radio show. 
A former Pro Football Writers of America president, Marvez has covered the NFL since 1995 and worked for the Sporting News, FOX Sports, South Florida Sun-Sentinel, Rocky Mountain News and Dayton Daily News and has a Hall of Fame vote. He worked previously for the Miami Herald, covering the Miami Heat, Florida International University sports and high school sports, along with writing a pro wrestling column starting in 1989. That later continued for Scripps-Howard News Service until he shifted his work focus full-time to the NFL in 2012.

In 2019, Marvez joined the professional wrestling promotion All Elite Wrestling as a play-by-play commentator and became a part of the inaugural broadcast team, alongside Jim Ross and Excalibur. As of October 2019, Marvez began doing backstage interviews for AEW and helps work with the production team in a variety of different roles.

He appears in the 2011 sports documentary series A Football Life and played himself in the 2014 movie Draft Day.

References

External links 

1971 births
Living people
All Elite Wrestling personnel
American color commentators
American people of Venezuelan descent
American radio sports announcers
Cincinnati Bengals announcers
Denver Broncos announcers
Florida International University alumni
Miami Dolphins announcers
National Football League announcers
People from Florida
Professional wrestling announcers